Eduardo Sergio de la Torre Jaramillo (born 27 February 1968) is a Mexican politician from the National Action Party (formerly from the Social Democratic Party). From 2006 to 2009 he served as Deputy of the LX Legislature of the Mexican Congress representing Veracruz.

References

1968 births
Living people
Politicians from Veracruz
Social Democratic Party (Mexico) politicians
National Action Party (Mexico) politicians
21st-century Mexican politicians
Deputies of the LX Legislature of Mexico
Members of the Chamber of Deputies (Mexico) for Veracruz